Qaleh-ye Molla Hoseyn Ali (also Romanized as Qal‘eh-ye Mollā Ḩoseyn ‘Alī) is a village in Farmeshkhan Rural District, in the Central District of Kavar County, Fars Province, Iran. At the 2006 census, its population became 66, in 14 families.

References 

Populated places in Kavar County